Clothier is an unincorporated community in Logan County, West Virginia, United States. Clothier has a post office with ZIP code 25047.

Clothier was named after the proprietor of a coal mine.

In 1974, Jack Corn, a DOCUMERICA photographer, photographed Clothier and its inhabitants for a project on mining and its environmental and health consequences. The images are available at Wikimedia Commons.

References

Gallery

Unincorporated communities in Logan County, West Virginia
Unincorporated communities in West Virginia